Pavel Vezhinov (November 9, 1914 – December 2, 1983), born Nikola Delchev Gugov, was a Bulgarian novelist and scriptwriter, with an interest for social and ethical issues and one of the first Bulgarian authors to use elements of fantasy in his fiction. Vezhinov is best known for his novels The Barrier (Бариерата) (1976) and In the night riding the white horses (Нощем с белите коне)(1975), both later adapted for screen, as well as the screenplay for the Bulgarian film classic Three Reservists (Тримата от запаса)(1971).

Life
Pavel Vezhinov was born on November 9, 1914 in Sofia. In the early 1930s he wrote for several magazines, including Жупел (Sulfur), РЛФ (RLF), Щит (Shield) and Изкуство и критика (Art and Critique). From 1938-1944 he studied philosophy at Sofia University. In 1938 he also published his first collection of stories, Улица без паваж (Street without Pavement), followed in 1943 by Дни и вечери (Days and Evenings). He joined the Bulgarian Communist Party in 1944.

Beginning in 1944, Vezhinov participated in World War II as a war correspondent and editor-in-chief of Фронтовак (Front Fighter). He later used his war experiences in stories like Златан (Zlatan) and Втора рота (Second Company, which has been republished several times).

From 1947 to 1951 Pavel Vezhinov was assistant chief editor of the satirical journal Стършел (Hornet), and from 1951 of the journal Септември (September). From 1954 to 1972 he worked for Българска кинематография (Bulgarian Cinematography) first as a scriptwriter and later as assistant General Director.

Throughout the 1950s and 1960s he published several crime stories and novels such as  Следите остават (Traces Remain, 1954), Произшествие на тихата улица (Silence on a Quiet Street, 1960), Човекът в сянка (Shadow Man, 1965), Прилепите летят нощем (Bats Fly at Night, 1969), as well as writing travel accounts of Bulgarian athletes at the Olympic games : Знамена по стадионите (Stadium Flags, 1950), На Олимпиада в Хелзенки (At the Olympics in Helsinki, 1953) and До Мелбълн по въздух и море (To Melbourne by Air and Sea, 1957). He served as a chief officer of the boxing section.

He was one of the first Bulgarian authors to use fantasy in his writing as a means to convey parable or metaphor. In 1956 he wrote a satirical story  Историята на едно привидение (The Story of an Enlightenment), and in 1965 the stories Сините пеперуди (Blue Butterflies) and Моят пръв ден (My First Day).  In 1973 he published a novel Гибелта на Аякс (The Death of Ajax).

In 1963 a collection of short stories Момчето с цигулката (The Boy with the Violin) came out and marked a new direction to his writing, when he became concerned with the moral and ethical issues of modern life: Дъх на бадеми (Almonds, 1966), Звездите над нас (The Stars Over Us, 1966) and Малките приключения (Little Adventures) followed.

The novel Нощем с белите коне (Night with White Horses, 1975) first appeared in the literary journal Септември. In 1976 it was followed by  Бариерата (The Barrier, 1976), for which he received another Dimitrov Prize. Each of the several years that followed was marked by another work:  Белият гущер (The White Lizard, 1977), Синият камък (The Blue Stone, 1977), Езерното момче (Lake Boy, 1979).

His last finished novel was Везни (Libra, 1982), in which the author continued reflecting on philosophical and psychological problems and the complexity of human existence. His last story Дълъг летен ден (Long Summer Day) was printed in the journal "Съвременник" (vol. 3, 1983 г.) shortly before his death.

Vezhinov died suddenly on December 20, 1983.

Awards

 "" order, II degree (1964)
 Title "" (1970)
 Title "" (1974)
 "Order of Georgi Dimitrov" (1974)
 Recipient of the Dimitrov Prize (1950, 1951, 1971, 1976)

Selected works

Collections of stories 

 Улици без паваж - 1938
 Дни и вечери - 1942
 На пост - 1947
 Мека мебел (роман)|Мека мебел - 1948
 Невероятни истории - 1958
 Нашата сила - 1958
 Момчето с цигулката - 1963
 Дъх на бадеми - 1966
 Сините пеперуди - 1968
 Синият камък . 1977

Stories 
 Бариерата - 1976
 Белият гущер - 1977
 Езерното момче - 1976
 Един есенен ден по шосето - 1967
 Втора рота - 1949
 В полето - 1950
 Златан - 1949
 Знамена над стадиона - 1950
 Далеч от бреговете - 1958
 Нашата сила - 1958
 Произшествие на тихата улица - 1960
 Кутия за енфие - 1973

Novels 
 Синият залез - 1947
 За честта на Родината - 1949
 Следите остават - 1954
 Произшествие на тихата улица - 1960
 Звездите над нас (Павел Вежинов)|Звездите над нас - 1966 
 Прилепите летят нощем - 1969
 Малките приключения - 1970
 Кутия за енфие - 1973
 Самопризнание - 1973
 Гибелта на Аякс - 1973
 Нощем с белите коне - 1975
 Малки семейни хроники - ироничен роман, София. 1982 г, 
 Везни - 1982

Film scripts 
 Бариерата (филм)|Бариерата
 Следите остават
 Зарево над Драва
 Тримата от запаса
 Специалист по всичко
 Среднощна среща
 На всеки километър
 Нощем с белите коне (филм)|Нощем с белите коне
 Произшествие на сляпата улица
 Трета след слънцето

Works translated into English 

 The Boy With the Violin. Sofia, Foreign Languages Press, (1965). 
 Far From the Shore. (Edited by Marjorie Pojarliova. Translated by Gregor Pavlov): Sofia, Foreign Languages Press, (1967)

References

1914 births
1982 deaths
Bulgarian speculative fiction writers
Bulgarian novelists
20th-century Bulgarian novelists